Gand Church is a parish church of the Church of Norway in the large Sandnes municipality  in Rogaland county, Norway. It is located in the borough of Sandved in the city of Sandnes in the far western part of the municipality. It is one of the two churches for the Gand parish which is part of the Sandnes prosti (deanery) in the Diocese of Stavanger. The large concrete church was built in a rectangular design in 1978 using designs by the architects Tonning and Øglænd. The church seats about 650 people.

Due to its size, it is sometimes referred to as the Jæren Cathedral. The church was consecrated on 3 December 1978.

See also
List of churches in Rogaland

References

Sandnes
Churches in Rogaland
20th-century Church of Norway church buildings
Churches completed in 1978
1978 establishments in Norway